Stojan Pilipović (born 2 February 1987) is a Serbian professional footballer who plays as a midfielder.

Club career
Pilipović made his senior debut with Novi Sad, before transferring to OFK Beograd in the summer of 2006, alongside Zoran Milovac. He started in both matches against Auxerre in the 2006–07 UEFA Cup second qualifying round, scoring a goal in the return leg. During his time at Karaburma, Pilipović was also sent on loan spells to Mačva Šabac and Borac Čačak.

After playing for Sloboda Mrkonjić Grad in Bosnia and Herzegovina, Pilipović returned to his country and joined Serbian League East side Dunav Prahovo in the summer of 2016. He left the club after one season.

International career
At international level, Pilipović was capped for Serbia and Montenegro at under-17 and under-19 levels.

Notes

References

External links
 
 
 

Association football midfielders
Expatriate footballers in Bosnia and Herzegovina
Expatriate footballers in Hungary
Expatriate footballers in Kazakhstan
FC Okzhetpes players
FK Banat Zrenjanin players
FK Borac Čačak players
FK Kolubara players
FK Mačva Šabac players
RFK Novi Sad 1921 players
FK Sloboda Užice players
Kazakhstan Premier League players
Kecskeméti TE players
Nemzeti Bajnokság I players
OFK Beograd players
People from Vrbas, Serbia
Serbia and Montenegro footballers
Serbian expatriate footballers
Serbian expatriate sportspeople in Bosnia and Herzegovina
Serbian expatriate sportspeople in Hungary
Serbian expatriate sportspeople in Kazakhstan
Serbian First League players
Serbian footballers
Serbian SuperLiga players
1987 births
Living people